The SS Alesia was a  ocean liner built for the Fabre Line in 1882. It served until 1899 when she was scrapped.

Description
She had a single funnel and two masts. Her engines were made by G. Forrester & Company, Liverpool. Her GRT was 2,790. Alesia had accommodation for 12 first class and 1,000 third class passengers.

History
Alesia was built by Thomas Royden and Sons in Liverpool. She was launched in June 1882, and entered service with the Fabre Line under the French flag. Her port of registry was Marseilles. Her maiden voyage was from Livorno, Italy to New York, United States via Tarragona, Spain, Bône, Algeria, Almería, and Málaga, Spain.  Most of her service was between ports in the Mediterranean and New York.

In September 1887, Alesia was placed in quarantine on arrival at New York due to an outbreak of cholera. Eight people had died from  the disease on the journey from Marseilles, France and Naples, Italy. By 10 October, the death toll was 25. A further 2 deaths were reported, before the ship came out of quarantine on 26 October.

Alesia arrived at Algiers, Algiera on 29 May 1899 with her cargo of sulphur on fire. The ship's cook had been killed by the fire. She was on a voyage from Palermo, Italy to New Orleans, United States.

References

1882 ships
Ocean liners
Ships built on the River Mersey
Steamships of France
Merchant ships of France